Eric Antonio Goles Chacc (born August 21, 1951) is a Chilean mathematician and computer scientist of Croatian descent. He studied civil engineering at the University of Chile before taking two doctorates at the University of Grenoble in France. A professor at the University of Chile, he is known for his work on cellular automata.

Goles was born in Antofagasta, northern Chile.

In 1993 Goles was awarded Chile's National Prize for Exact Sciences. He was President of CONICYT (the Chilean equivalent of the National Science Foundation in the U.S.), and an advisor on science and technology to the Chilean government.

Goles currently teaches and does research at the Adolfo Ibáñez University.

External links
 Goles Biography as a Director of the Chilean Millennium Science Initiative
 Fuller biography in Spanish at website of CONICYT

1951 births
Living people
Chilean computer scientists
20th-century Chilean mathematicians
21st-century Chilean mathematicians
Cellular automatists
People from Antofagasta
Chilean people of Croatian descent
University of Chile alumni
Grenoble Alpes University alumni
Academic staff of the University of Chile